The Bate Islands are an island group located in the Coronation Gulf, south of Victoria Island, in the Kitikmeot Region, Nunavut, Canada. Other island groups in the vicinity include the Miles Islands, Nauyan Islands, Outpost Islands, Richardson Islands, and Sisters Islands.

References

 Bate Islands (#1) Nunavut, at Atlas of Canada

Islands of Coronation Gulf
Uninhabited islands of Kitikmeot Region